Renivaldo Pereira de Jesus (born 19 February 1974), known as Pena, is a Brazilian former professional footballer who played as a striker.

Club career
Pena was born in Vitória da Conquista, Bahia. After playing with modest clubs in his country he had his first taste of European football in 1998, but only lasted a few months with Grasshopper Club Zürich, moving then to Sociedade Esportiva Palmeiras.

In 2000, Pena signed for FC Porto, where he was the top scorer in the Primeira Liga in his first season with 22 goals while also adding the Taça de Portugal. After falling out with coach Octávio Machado he was loaned to RC Strasbourg Alsace in France, where he failed to settle; two other loans ensued, and the player experienced some success at both S.C. Braga and C.S. Marítimo.

Released by Porto in June 2005, Pena returned to Brazil. After a spell with Botafogo de Futebol e Regatas he saw out his career with modest sides, retiring in 2011 at the age of 37.

Personal life
Pena's son, Pablo, was also a footballer and a forward.

Honours
Porto
Taça de Portugal: 2000–01
Supertaça Cândido de Oliveira: 2001

Individual
Primeira Liga top scorer: 2000–01 (22 goals)

References

External links

1974 births
Living people
People from Vitória da Conquista
Sportspeople from Bahia
Brazilian footballers
Association football forwards
Campeonato Brasileiro Série A players
Campeonato Brasileiro Série B players
Rio Branco Esporte Clube players
Ceará Sporting Club players
Sociedade Esportiva Palmeiras players
Botafogo de Futebol e Regatas players
Paulista Futebol Clube players
Associação Desportiva Confiança players
Swiss Super League players
Grasshopper Club Zürich players
Primeira Liga players
FC Porto players
S.C. Braga players
C.S. Marítimo players
Ligue 1 players
RC Strasbourg Alsace players
Brazilian expatriate footballers
Expatriate footballers in Switzerland
Expatriate footballers in Portugal
Expatriate footballers in France
Brazilian expatriate sportspeople in Switzerland
Brazilian expatriate sportspeople in Portugal
Brazilian expatriate sportspeople in France